The men's team was an archery event held as part of the Archery at the 1992 Summer Olympics programme.

Results
The score for the team ranking round was the sum of the three archers' scores in the individual ranking round. No further shooting was done to determine team rankings.

Ranking round

Knockout stage

Round of 16

The top sixteen teams in the qualifying round earned the opportunity to compete in the head-to-head elimination matches.

Quarterfinals

All four of the top-ranked teams fell in the quarterfinals, eliminating them from medal contention and leaving such surprise contenders as #10-ranked host nation Spain.

Semifinals

The host nation continued an impressive run by knocking off the #6-ranked British team in a close match.  

Final

After having defeated #7-ranked Denmark, #2-ranked Unified Team, and #6-ranked Great Britain, Spain was able to pull off one more astonishing upset, this time against #5-ranked Finland, to claim the gold medal on their home turf. It was Spain's first Olympic medal in archery.

References

Sources
 Official Report
 

Archery at the 1992 Summer Olympics
Men's events at the 1992 Summer Olympics